DYKU (88.7 FM), broadcasting as 88.7 Radyo Bandera Sweet FM, is a radio station owned by FBS Radio Network and operated by Bandera News Philippines. The station's studio and transmitter are located at Door 5, Paula Apartment, M. Jayme St, Jaro, Iloilo City.

History
The station was inaugurated in 1996 as Mellow Touch 88.7 with an easy listening format. In 2000, it rebranded as Radio One 88.7 and switched to a Top 40 format. In January 2010, it went off the air due to transmitter problems. In July 2010, it returned on air as Mellow 887 with an Adult Top 40 format. It went off the air sometime in 2015. On late May 2021, 5K Broadcasting Network took over the station's operations and became part of the Radyo Bandera Sweet FM network.

References

Radio stations in Iloilo City
Radio stations established in 1996
Radio stations disestablished in 2015
Radio stations established in 2021